Lauren Mollica (born July 7, 1980) is an American professional skateboarder from New Brunswick, New Jersey.

Skateboarding
Mollica is one of a very small group of professional female skaters. Started by snowboarding, and only skateboarded off and on until she graduated high school.

Her sponsors include Gallaz and Rookie.

Skateboard videos
Mollica is featured on the skate DVD Getting Nowhere Faster. She is also featured giving skateboarding tips as a bonus feature on AKA: Girl Skater but does not appear on the feature itself.

Feature films
Mollica made her feature film debut in Itty Bitty Titty Committee as the trans man character Aggie.

References

External links
Girls Skate Network Interview

American skateboarders
Living people
Female skateboarders
Sportspeople from New Brunswick, New Jersey
1980 births
American sportswomen
21st-century American women